Bhool Bhulaiyaa is a 2007 Indian Hindi-language psychological comedy horror film directed by Priyadarshan from the screenplay by Neeraj Vora and produced by T Series. It is an official remake of the Malayalam film Manichitrathazhu (1993) by Fazil.
The film stars Akshay Kumar, Vidya Balan, Shiney Ahuja, Ameesha Patel, Paresh Rawal, Rajpal Yadav, Manoj Joshi, Asrani and Vikram Gokhale. The film score and soundtrack were composed by Ranjit Barot and Pritam respectively, with lyrics written by Sameer and Sayeed Quadri.

Made on a budget of 32 crore, Bhool Bhulaiyaa earned 82 crore worldwide, thus becoming the eighth-highest grossing Hindi film of 2007. It received positive reviews from critics upon release, with praise for its direction, screenplay, humor, and soundtrack, with particular praise directed towards Kumar and Balan's performances. At the 53rd Filmfare Awards, Balan was nominated for Best Actress.

Over the years, the film has attained a cult status across the audience owing to Kumar's psychiatrist character, Balan's dual portrayal of Avni and Manjulika, and its music. The film spawned a standalone sequel titled Bhool Bhulaiyaa 2 (2022) which was directed by Anees Bazmee starring Tabu, Kartik Aaryan, Kiara Advani and Rajpal Yadav. Third sequel is set to be release on Diwali 2024 starring Kartik Aaryan.

Plot
Badrinarayan "Badri" Chaturvedi heads a former royal family of Varanasi whose ancestral palace is believed to be haunted by the ghost of Manjulika, a classical dancer from Bengal. Siddharth, son of Badri's elder brother, and his archeologist wife Avni return to the palace from the United States. This marriage has broken the heart of Siddharth's childhood love interest and Badri's adopted daughter Radha.

Avni develops an interest in the legend of Manjulika. She has a conversation with Janki, who reveals that the Chaturvedis' ancestor, Raja Vibhuti Narayan, was infatuated with Manjulika, a dancer in his court. Manjulika loved Shashidhar, another dancer of the court. The king, who had learned of their affair, publicly beheads Shashidhar on the night of Durgashtami and imprisons Manjulika, who swore vengeance before hanging herself. Raja Vibhuti Narayan mysteriously died, and rumors of the palace being haunted spread. Priests locked up Manjulika's and Shashidhar's spirits on the third floor of the palace. Avni gets a duplicate key from Batukshankar's daughter, Nandhini. Despite Badri's warnings, she opens the door and is berated by Radha, because the locksmith who made the key mysteriously died. Unnatural events start taking place. Things inexplicably break and fall down, an apparition of a woman frightens everyone in the palace, and Avni's sari catches fire during the day. Suspicion falls on Radha, who was found at every scene of the incident.

Siddharth, who does not believe in superstitions, suspects Radha has become mentally unstable after her heartbreak and is behind the strange occurrences. He brings his psychiatrist friend, doctor Aditya Shrivastava, to treat Radha. As soon as he arrives, a mysterious figure tries to kill Nandhini by knocking her unconscious and imprisoning her in a room, and is saved by Aditya and Siddharth. Aditya's unconventional nature leads the household to think of him as a fool. An attempt to kill Siddharth is made by poisoning his tea, which is foiled by Aditya. One night, Aditya hears the sound of a Ghungroo and the voice of someone singing in Bengali from Manjulika's room. Posing as Raja Vibhuti Narayan, he converses with Manjulika, who vows revenge on the next Durgashtami.

During the engagement of Nandhini to poet Sharad Pradhan, Sharad mysteriously disappears along with Avni. Siddharth and Aditya find Avni being sexually harassed by Sharad. Settling the confusions, Aditya reveals that Avni has dissociative identity disorder and associates herself with Manjulika. Aditya started suspecting her after she showed a little too much enthusiasm in Manjulika's room, and visited Avni's hometown to gather information about her. She associates Siddharth with Raja Vibhuti Narayan and Sharad with Shashidhar, for he resides in the same house Shashidhar used to live in.

Meanwhile, Badri brings renowned exorcist Yagyaprakash Bharti to solve the problems in the palace. To everyone's surprise, Aditya and Yagyaprakash are longtime friends, and they deeply discuss the matter, in which Aditya intends to cure Avni by using an unconventional method of psychiatry. Siddharth believes Aditya after he provokes Avni, who transitions to Manjulika. Aditya explains that DID is a lifelong condition, but Avni might be cured if they satisfy Manjulika's purpose for existing: killing Raja Vibhuti Narayan.

On Durgashtami, Aditya puts a pair of ghungroo on Avni's legs and sees her assume Manjulika's identity, dressed as her and dancing in the courtroom. Sharad appears in front of Avni, who sees him as Shashidhar and dances to Manjulika and Shashidhar's song. Sharad lures Avni to Yagyaprakash, who makes Manjulika promise to leave if she gets the opportunity to kill the Raja and gives her a sword. She sees Siddharth as Raja Vibhuti Narayan and tries to kill him before Yagyaprakash blows smoke and ash on her, and Aditya opens a trapdoor to let Siddharth escape and trick Manjulika into thinking she is killing the King, whereas she is slaying a dummy. Avni gets cured after the orchestrated murder, thinking Manjulika has taken her revenge.

The family members, now pleased with Aditya, thank him for his help. Aditya tells Radha that he will send his parents over with a proposal if she is interested in marrying him, and she waves him with a smile from the balcony.

Cast
Akshay Kumar as Dr. Aditya "Adi" Shrivastav
Vidya Balan in dual roles as Avni S. Chaturvedi and Witch Manjulika
Shiney Ahuja in dual roles as Siddharth Chaturvedi and Raja Vibhuti Narayan
Ameesha Patel as Radha  Chaturvedi
Paresh Rawal as Batukshankar Upadhyay
Manoj Joshi as Badrinarayan "Badri" Chaturvedi
Rajpal Yadav as Chhote Pandit 
Asrani as Murari
Vikram Gokhale as Acharya Yagyaprakash Bharti
Rasika Joshi as Janki Batukshankar Upadhyay (née Chaturvedi)
Tarina Patel as Nandini Sharad Pradhan (née Upadhyay)
Vineeth in dual roles as Professor Sharad Pradhan and Shashidhar
Kaveri Jha as Girja Upadhyay 
Jimit Trivedi as Chandu Chaturvedi
Baby Farida as Avni's Grandmother
Ashmita as Manjulika's double

Production

Casting
Originally, Aishwarya Rai Bachchan and Katrina Kaif were the first female choices for Bhool Bhulaiyaa. They turned down the offer due to working load, and were replaced by Vidya Balan and Ameesha Patel, respectively.

Music

Score
The film score was composed and produced by Ranjit Barot.

Songs 

The songs featured in the film composed by Pritam, were released in July 2007. The title song, commonly known as "Hare Ram Hare Krishna Hare Ram", sung by Neeraj Shridhar, was one of the biggest hits of the year starring Akshay Kumar. According to the Indian trade website Box Office India, with around 12,00,000 units sold, this film's soundtrack album was the year's eighth highest-selling.

The title song "Bhool Bhulaiyaa" is lifted from Korean band JtL's song "My Lecon". Songs "Allah Hafiz", "Labon Ko" and "Ami Je Tomar/Mere Dholna" also became chartbusters of the year.

Release
The film was worldwide released on 11 October 2007. The DVD of the movie was released by Eros Home Media. The distribution rights of the movie were acquired to Disney India. The television premiere of the movie was occurred on Star Plus on 15 February 2008. The film was first made streaming available on Netflix on 15the September 2019. Later the film was removed from Netflix on 22 July 2020. On 3 March 2022 the film was made streaming available on Disney+ Hotstar.

Box office 
Bhool Bhulaiyaa was declared a hit at the box office by Box Office India, netting  in India. It was the 6th highest-grossing Bollywood film of 2007. It grossed ₹3,88,00,000 on its first day, while it grossed ₹23,50,00,000 in the first week. The total overseas gross was $3,910,000. The lifetime overseas breakup was $1,380,000 in UK, $1,130,000 in North America, $820,000 in UAE, $151,000 in Australia and $429,000 in other markets.

The film collected  worldwide.

Awards

Sequels

A standalone sequel starring, Tabu, Kartik Aaryan and Kiara Advani titled Bhool Bhulaiyaa 2 was released on 20 May 2022.

The third installment titled "Bhool Bhulaiyaa 3" was officially announced with a teaser on 1 March  2023 by T-Series, to be again directed by Anees Bazmee and Kartik Aaryan will reprise his role as "Rooh Baba" and this film will be released on Diwali 2024.

References

External links
 
 

2000s Hindi-language films
2007 films
Indian comedy horror films
Hindi remakes of Malayalam films
2007 comedy horror films
Indian horror film remakes
Films directed by Priyadarshan
Films featuring songs by Pritam
Films set in Rajasthan
Films shot in Rajasthan
T-Series (company) films
2007 comedy films
Hindi-language comedy films
Hindi-language horror films